Zhang Zuo (Chinese: 左章; pinyin: Zuǒ Zhāng, born 10 October 1988), also known by the name Zee Zee, is a Chinese pianist, who has won first prize awards at the 1st International Piano Competition in China, the Gina Bachauer International Artists Piano Competition in the United States, the Krainev International Piano Competition in Ukraine, and the Juilliard School's 32nd annual William Petschek Piano Recital Award.

Early life 
Born in Shenzhen, Guangdong Province of China, Zuo went to Germany to start her musical training at the age of 5. She enrolled at the Shenzhen Arts School at the age of 7, and began studying with Dan Zhaoyi, a famous Chinese piano educator and professor. At the age of 8, she began winning competitions and gave her first concerto performance. It was then she performed the Haydn's Piano Concerto No. 11 in D major with the Shenzhen Symphony Orchestra. At the age of 10, she gave her first solo concert in Shenzhen and became a representative of the Chinese piano community.

After completing her piano studies with Dan Zhaoyii at the Shenzhen Arts School, Zuo was invited to continue her artistic development in 2006 in the United States, where she attended the University of Rochester's Eastman School of Music under the mentorship of Nelita True for her bachelor's degree. Later, she completed her master's degree at the Juilliard School, where she studied with Robert McDonald and Yoheved Kaplinsky. In 2014, Zuo was selected to join BBC's flagship New Generation Artist (NGA) program in the UK for two seasons. She has also performed with the Cincinnati Symphony Orchestra under Paavo Järvi in Mendelssohn's first piano concerto, as well as at the Ravinia Festival. In the autumn of 2014, Zuo went on a recital tour through Italy with violinist Julian Rachlin and cellist Lynn Harrell.

Career
On February 7, 2023 IMG Artists announced Zuo joined their roster for general management, represented by Iris Yuan from London.

Achievements 
Zuo's playing is described as "full of enthusiasm and glamour, radiating the vigor of youth" (Chinese Gramophone),

Zuo has performed with many world-renowned orchestras in China and abroad, including the BBC Symphony Orchestra, London Philharmonic Orchestra, the National Orchestra of Belgium, Cincinnati Symphony Orchestra, Tenerife Symphony Orchestra, Lübeck Symphony Orchestra, Neue Philharmonie, Kharkov Philharmonic, Orchestre Royal de Chambre de Wallonie, Macau Symphony Orchestra, Hong Kong Philharmonic Orchestra, Shanghai Philharmonic Orchestra, Beijing Symphony Orchestra, Guangzhou Philharmonic, and the Shenzhen Philharmonic, etc. She has worked with leading conductors including Paavo Järvi, Marin Alsop, and Yan Pascal Tortelier, and has appeared at many of the world's most prestigious venues, including Carnegie Hall, Lincoln Center, the Kennedy Center for the Performing Arts, Palais des Beaux-Arts in Brussels, and the Grand Hall of the Moscow State Conservatory, Salle Cortot in Paris, and Moscow's Bolshoi Hall.

Zuo has won many awards, among which include first prizes in the American Gina Bachauer International Young Artists Piano Competition (2000), the Ukraine Krainev International Piano Competition for Young Pianists (2002), top prizes from the 3rd Shanghai International Piano Competition (2005), the 7th International Franz Liszt Piano Competition (2005), first prizes at China's 1st International Piano Concerto Competition (2006), a Vendome Virtuoso award from Vendome Prize competition, the youngest laureate in the 2010 Gina Bachauer Artists Piano Competition, the Petschek Piano Award at the Juilliard School (2013), as well as the 5th prize at the 2013 Queen Elisabeth International Piano Competition in the Brussels, etc.

References

External links
 

1988 births
Living people
Chinese classical pianists
Chinese women pianists
Women classical pianists
21st-century classical pianists
21st-century women pianists